Raymond E. Elliott (born circa 1895) was a rugby union player who represented Australia.

Elliott, a flanker, was born in Sydney and claimed a total of 13 international rugby caps for Australia.

References

                   

Australian rugby union players
Australia international rugby union players
Year of birth uncertain
Rugby union flankers
Rugby union players from Sydney